The Texas A&M Aggies men's basketball team represents Texas A&M University in NCAA Division I college basketball. The Aggies compete in the Southeastern Conference. Since 1998, the teams has played its home games at Reed Arena, a 12,989-capacity arena in College Station, Texas on the campus of Texas A&M University. Texas A&M has appeared in the NCAA tournament 15 times, most recently in 2023. The Aggies are currently coached by Buzz Williams who was hired on April 3, 2019, prior to the start of the 2019–2020 season.

History

Metcalf era
Shelby Metcalf took over the A&M basketball program in 1963.  His impact was immediate, winning the Southwest Conference with a 13–1 conference record for Texas A&M's first title in 13 years.  In his 26 years as head coach at Texas A&M, he won six Southwest Conference titles, two Southwest Conference tournament titles, and led A&M to six NCAA Tournament and four NIT appearances.  He was fired by former A&M football player and then-athletic director John David Crow after coaching 19 games of the 1989–1990 season. When asked by the media what happened between the two, Metcalf remarked, "I made a comment that I didn't think John David was all that bright. And I thought I was being generous."  Metcalf finished his career at A&M with an overall record of 438–306, making him the all-time winningest men's basketball coach in Southwest Conference history.

The Dark Ages
After Metcalf was fired, A&M went through the next 14 years making only one postseason appearance (1994 NIT), finished above .500 in conference play only twice, and posted an overall record of .500 or above only twice.  John Thornton finished out the 1990 season as head coach after Metcalf was fired.  Soon after, Kermit Davis, Jr. was hired prior to the 1990–91 season, after posting a 50–12 record in two seasons at Idaho.  He resigned after one season at 8–21 and Texas A&M began investigating recruiting violations by Davis. He was soon placed on a two-year probation by the NCAA and coached at a community college in Florida. Tony Barone was hired from Creighton in 1991 to replace Davis.  Barone lasted seven years as head coach of the program, finishing below .500 six times.  It was in 1994 that he finished with a 10–4 league record for 2nd place in the Southwest Conference and was invited to the NIT.  After Barone finished last in the Big 12 Conference in 1998, Melvin Watkins was hired out of UNC-Charlotte.  While a good recruiter, Watkins never finished above seventh in the Big 12.  He resigned after going winless (0–16) in conference play in 2004.

Since 2004

Gillispie era
After Watkins resigned, Billy Gillispie, was hired out of UTEP after leading the Miners to an NCAA Tournament appearance and having the largest turnaround of any team in the nation, from 6–24 in 2002–03 to 24–8 in 2003–04.  The Aggies, though picked by Big 12 coaches to finish last in the conference, immediately improved under Gillispie, winning their first 10 games and finishing at 21–10, 8–8 in conference.  Along the way, the team defeated ranked, in-state rivals Texas and Texas Tech.  The team earned an NIT bid, Texas A&M's first postseason in 11 years, reaching the quarterfinals of the tournament.

Gillispie's second year featured further improvement, with the Aggies defeating three ranked opponents in Colorado, Texas, and Syracuse.  The team finished with a league record of 10–6 and a win in the Big 12 Tournament, Texas A&M's first since the conference first began play in 1996–97.  The Aggies reached the NCAA Tournament for the first time since 1987 as a 12-seed, upsetting fifth-seed Syracuse in the first round.  The Aggies fell in the second round to LSU on the final shot of the game.

In the 2006–07 season, A&M started ranked at #13. Despite early-season losses to LSU and UCLA, the Aggies were able to secure a win at Allen Fieldhouse over #6 Kansas, a first for a Big 12 South team since the conference was formed. They finished with just three losses in conference play (a sweep by Texas Tech and a double-overtime loss to a Kevin Durant-led Texas in Austin) and were able to secure the #2 seed in the Big 12 tournament. The Aggies lost in the quarterfinals to Oklahoma State. They received a #3 seed in the 2007 NCAA championship tournament, their highest seed ever, and reached the Sweet 16. In the postseason, A&M achieved a #9 ranking by the Associated Press and ESPN/USA Today coaches polls, the highest ranking ever attained in school history. In this season, they were the only program in the Big 12 Conference to have both men's and women's teams competing in the NCAA Tournament – the men as a #3 seed and the women as a #4 seed.

On April 6, 2007, Gillispie resigned his position as head coach at Texas A&M to coach at the University of Kentucky. Four days later, on April 10, Mark Turgeon, head coach of Wichita State University, was announced as the new men's basketball head coach at A&M.

Turgeon era

Under Turgeon and his staff from 2007 to 2011, the Aggies had their greatest four year win total in program history. The Aggies started the 2007–08 season ranked 14th in the preseason Coaches Poll. Once the season progressed, they won the 2007 NIT Season Tip-Off to extend their winning streak to 7–0. Their first loss of the season came to unranked Arizona. After the Arizona game, they would then win eight straight home games against unranked opponents. Team performance spiraled down once conference play had begun, losing to three straight unranked teams—at Texas Tech, at Michael Beasley-led Kansas State, and at home to Baylor in a 5-overtime classic. The Aggies would post wins at their next five matchups, including one over the 10th-ranked rival Texas Longhorns and three away games. They then regressed, losing to Oklahoma State and Nebraska at home. Another high point came when they defeated Texas Tech 98–54 at home, matching their highest margin of victory in school history (set in 1959 against Texas). The Aggies regressed once again, this time losing 64–37 at Oklahoma. After the blowout, the Aggies were able to revenge Baylor in Waco, though came back home to lose their final regular season game to eventual national champion Kansas to finish the season at 8–8 in conference play. The team received a No. 6 bid to the Big 12 tournament, defeating Iowa State and Kansas State in the first two rounds, but lost to Kansas again in the semifinals. With their 24–10 record after the Big 12 tournament, the Aggies received a No. 9 at-large bid to the West Regional of the NCAA tournament. In the first round, they defeated 8th-seeded BYU 67–62 at Anaheim. In the second round, they faced UCLA at the same site, though allowed them to escape with a close 51–49 win. The Aggies finished the season with a 25–11 record. The 25 wins matches the record for most wins by a first-year coach at a Big 12 school, set by former Texas coach Tom Penders in the 1988–89 season.

The 2008–09 Aggies, led by Turgeon in his second year, went 14–1 in non-conference play, with wins over Alabama, Arizona, and LSU; the one loss was handed to them by Tulsa. Josh Carter and Bryan Davis received preseason Big 12 honorable mention. The team did not make the top 25 of the preseason AP or Coaches polls, though received votes. During the 2009 signing period, the Aggies signed Naji Hibbert, Khris Middleton, Kourtney Roberson, and Ray Turner, all of whom were listed in the Rivals.com Top 150 prospects for the class of 2009. The Aggies went 9–7 in Big 12 play to make the NCAA tournament for the fourth straight year; they defeated BYU in the first round for the second consecutive year before losing to UConn. Josh Carter became an All-Big 12 Third Team selection, while Derrick Roland was selected to the Big 12 All-Defensive Team. The Aggies finished 24–10, giving Turgeon 49 wins over two years.

In the 2009–10 season, the Aggies played a considerably tougher non-conference schedule, going 10–3. Senior guard Derrick Roland broke his leg grotesquely in December and missed the rest of the season. The team was picked to finish fifth in the Big 12 in the preseason coaches' poll but finished tied for second. With their 22–8 regular-season finish and 11–5 mark in conference play, the Aggies participated in the 2010 Big 12 Tournament and defeated Nebraska before losing to No. 1 Kansas in the semifinals. They received an at–large bid to the NCAA tournament and earned a 5 seed in the South Region. They defeated 12 seed Utah State in the first round before falling to 4 seed Purdue in overtime in the second round to finish their season at 24–10. Donald Sloan made All-Big 12 First Team as a senior and Bryan Davis was named to the All-Big 12 Defensive team; they graduated with 100 wins, the most by any class in Aggie basketball history. Turgeon's 73 wins at the conclusion of the season surpassed Gillispie's 70 in three years at A&M.

Prior to the beginning of his last year at Texas A&M, Turgeon had negotiated a contract extension and salary increase, but he was growing more unhappy with the Aggie fanbase. During his final season coaching the Aggies Turgeon publicly express unhappiness with the inconsistent fan support from both students and public ticket holders. On the evening of May 9, 2011 at 8pm (local time), Turgeon met with his coaching staff and players to inform them that half an hour earlier he accepted the head coach position at the University of Maryland. He had visited the campus earlier that day and left with an offer. When asked about his decision at an Aggie Athletics press conference he said "Maryland's got a great basketball tradition. [Texas A&M and Maryland are] real similar. It's a gut feeling." In their meeting earlier that night he told the Aggie players "it was the hardest decision [he] ever had to make... because of [them]." Turgeon said that fan attendance at A&M did not factor into his decision.

Kennedy Era

Following the 2010 season, Mark Turgeon left the Texas Aggies for the University of Maryland, opening the door for Billy Kennedy to become the new head coach of the team. Kennedy, who arrived after coaching at Murray State, was known for his good coaching record for the Racers his final years there.

Kennedy's first three years at Texas A&M began as a slow progression in terms of quality of the teams, going 14-18, 18–15, and 18–16 respectively, with his 3rd year team being invited to the annual end-of-year CBI basketball tournament.

The 2014–15 season saw the Aggies vie for a spot in the NCAA tournament, but the team lost 4 of their last 5 games, so they were instead invited to the NIT. They finished the season with a record of 21–12.

His next year saw one of the best years in Aggie men's basketball in nearly a decade, with the team winning a share the conference regular season title. The Aggies were invited to the NCAA tournament as a 3 seed, and played all the way to the Sweet Sixteen, where they were eventually defeated by Oklahoma, finishing the season with a record of 28–9.

The next year was considered by many to be a rebuilding year, as 4 starting seniors were graduating, with 3 heading for the NBA: Danuel House, Alex Caruso, and Jalen Jones. The team, which was led by mostly sophomores, went on to finish the season with a record of 16–15, and were not invited to any postseason tournaments for the first time since 2013.

The following year, the Aggies returned most of their starters from the previous year, now as mostly juniors, and began the season with a lot of promise, landing a No. 25 spot in the preseason AP poll and reaching as high as No. 5 during the regular season. After a string of injuries and suspensions, the team hobbled to the end of the season, but not without landing a spot in the NCAA tournament. Earning a 7 seed, the team went on to defeat Providence and the defending national champions, North Carolina, to earn a spot in the Sweet Sixteen, their 2nd in 3 years. The team would lose to Michigan in the Sweet Sixteen, and finish the season with a record of 22–13. Sophomore starting center Robert Williams, as well as juniors Tyler Davis and D. J. Hogg would then declare for the NBA draft.

The next year was the worst year the Aggies had under Kennedy as head coach since his first one. The departure of 3 starters to the NBA draft as well as senior Admon Gilder to a season ending illness/injury before the season began did not bode well for the upcoming season. This was further stressed when the only returning starter from the previous season, TJ Starks, got a season-ending injury midway through conference play. With only 7 scholarship players left the Aggies fought hard with the addition of 2 walk-ons taking TJ's place- Mark French and Chris Collins. The Aggies finished the season 14–18. Kennedy was fired following the conclusion of the season.

Buzz Era

Following Kennedy's firing by Scott Woodward, the Aggies hired Virginia Tech men's basketball coach Buzz Williams on April 3, 2019, following the Hokies loss to Duke in the Sweet 16 of the 2019 NCAA Division I men's basketball tournament. The Aggies were picked to place 12th in the SEC preseason poll and began the season with a rough stretch, including losses to Temple and Fairfield. However, the team would eventually find its rhythm in its stifling defense, finishing the regular season with an overall record of 16–14, 10–8 in the SEC, the most wins since the 2016 Sweet Sixteen season and placing them in a tie for 6th in the conference. However, before any postseason play could begin, the season was cut short due to the COVID-19 pandemic. The 2020-21 season was marred by injury and illness, finishing with a record of 8–10, 2–8 in SEC play. The 2021-2022 season started with promise as A&M began SEC play 4-0 but hit a rough patch, losing 8 conference games in a row. However, the Aggies would catch fire late in the season, winning 8 of their final 9 games. A&M would enter the SEC Tournament, where they would upset #1 seed and SEC Regular Season Champions Auburn, and an Arkansas team that many considered one of the hottest teams in the country. The Aggies would lose to Tennessee in the tournament final, costing the team a spot in the NCAA Tournament. They went on to play for the NIT championship where they lost to Xavier 73-72.

Top 25 poll finishes 
The AP Poll first appeared on January 20, 1949, and has since been published continuously. The Coaches' Poll began selecting the top 20 teams on a weekly basis during the 1950–1951 college basketball season. It was initially published by United Press from 1950 through 1990, followed by USA Today/CNN from 1991 through 1996, and USA Today/ESPN from 1997 through 2004, and USA Today from 2005 to the present. In the 1990–1991 basketball season the poll expanded to a top 25, and it has since retained this format. Both polls referred to below are the final regular-season polls; that is, not the final post-tournament polls.

Postseason
The Aggies have appeared in the NCAA tournament 15 times. Their combined record is 13–16.

NCAA tournament results

NIT results
The Aggies have appeared in the National Invitation Tournament (NIT) eight times. Their combined record is 11–8.

CBI results
The Aggies have appeared in the College Basketball Invitational (CBI) one time. Their record is 1–1.

Notable former players

Jalen Jones (born 1993), basketball player for Hapoel Haifa in the Israeli Basketball Premier League
Josh Nebo (born 1997), basketball player in the Israeli Basketball Premier League
Elijah Thomas (born 1996), basketball player in the Israeli Basketball Premier League

Aggies in the NBA

Management
R. C. Buford – General Manager – San Antonio Spurs
 Bryson Graham – Assistant General Manager. New Orleans Pelicans

Current players
DeAndre Jordan — Denver Nuggets
Khris Middleton — Milwaukee Bucks
Danuel House – Philadelphia 76ers
Alex Caruso – Chicago Bulls
Robert Williams – Boston Celtics
Quenton Jackson – Washington Wizards

Honored jerseys

Notes

Records

Career Points Scored
Records accurate as of the 2020-21 season

Current coaching and support staff
Buzz Williams – Head Coach
Devin Johnson – Assistant Coach
Lyle Wolf – Assistant Coach
Dale Layer   – Special Assistant to the Head Coach

Regular-season tournaments

Texas A&M has played in the following regular-season tournaments since 2006.

See also

References

External links